James Palmer Campbell (1855 – 27 February 1926) was a member of the New Zealand Legislative Council from 2 September 1921 to 27 February 1926, when he died. He was appointed by the Reform Government.

He was from Auckland.

References 

1855 births
1926 deaths
Members of the New Zealand Legislative Council
Reform Party (New Zealand) MLCs
People from Auckland